William McDiarmid House is a historic home located at Fayetteville, Cumberland County, North Carolina. It was built in 1907, and is a -story, three bay, American Foursquare frame dwelling with Late Victorian / Colonial Revival styling.  It features a massive wraparound porch with a gazebo-like pentagonal corner projection and Tuscan order columns.

It was listed on the National Register of Historic Places in 1983.

References

Houses on the National Register of Historic Places in North Carolina
Colonial Revival architecture in North Carolina
Victorian architecture in North Carolina
Houses completed in 1907
Houses in Fayetteville, North Carolina
National Register of Historic Places in Cumberland County, North Carolina